Coronaridine, also known as 18-carbomethoxyibogamine, is an alkaloid found in Tabernanthe iboga and related species, including Tabernaemontana divaricata for which (under the now obsolete synonym Ervatamia coronaria) it was named.

Like ibogaine, (R)-coronaridine and (S)-coronaridine can decrease intake of cocaine and morphine intake in animals and it may have muscle relaxant and hypotensive activity.

Chemistry

Congeners
Coronaridine congers are important in drug discovery and development due to multiple actions on different targets. They have ability to inhibit Cav2.2 channel, modulate and inhibit subunits of nAChr selectively such as α9α10, α3β4 and potentiate GABAA activity.

Pharmacology
Coronaridine has been reported to bind to an assortment of molecular sites, including: μ-opioid (Ki = 2.0 μM), δ-opioid (Ki = 8.1 μM), and κ-opioid receptors (Ki = 4.3 μM), NMDA receptor (Ki = 6.24 μM) (as an antagonist), and nAChRs (as an antagonist). It has also been found to inhibit the enzyme acetylcholinesterase, act as a voltage-gated sodium channel blocker, and displays estrogenic activity in rodents. In contrast to ibogaine and other iboga alkaloids, coronaridine does not bind to either the σ1 or σ2 receptor.

Sources

See also
 Dregamine
 Ibogaine
 Ibogamine
 Tabernanthine
 Voacangine

References

Acetylcholinesterase inhibitors
Alkaloids
Alkaloids found in Iboga
Carboxylate esters
Ethers
Nicotinic antagonists
NMDA receptor antagonists
Opioids
Phytoestrogens
Sodium channel blockers